Maurice Feltin (15 May 1883 – 27 September 1975) was a French cardinal of the Roman Catholic Church. He served as Archbishop of Paris from 1949 to 1966, and was elevated to the cardinalate in 1953 by Pope Pius XII.

Biography
Born in Delle, Territoire-de-Belfort, Maurice Feltin studied at the Seminary of Saint-Sulpice in Paris before being ordained a priest on 3 July 1909. He then did pastoral work in Besançon until 1914, at which time he was made an officer in the French Army during World War I. For his work, he was awarded with the Croix-de-Guerre, the Médaille militaire, and the Légion d'honneur.

On 19 December 1927, Feltin was appointed Bishop of Troyes by Pope Pius XI. He received his episcopal consecration on 11 March 1928 from Cardinal Henri-Charles-Joseph Binet, with Bishops Paul-Jules-Narcisse Rémond and Jean-Marcel Rodié serving as co-consecrators. Feltin was promoted to Archbishop of Sens on 16 August 1932, and was later named Archbishop of Bordeaux on 16 December 1935. On 15 August 1949, he became the twenty-third Archbishop of Paris.

He was created Cardinal Priest of Santa Maria della Pace by Pope Pius XII in the consistory of 12 January 1953. He was one of the cardinal electors who participated in the 1958 papal conclave and the 1963 papal conclave.  He attended the Second Vatican Council from 1962 to 1965. He resigned as Paris' archbishop on 21 December 1966.

He died in Thiais, outside Paris, at age 92, and was buried in Notre Dame Cathedral.

Trivia
Feltin condemned the legend of Santa Claus, claiming that it debased the "Christian significance of Christmas".
In 1959, Feltin requested of the Holy Office that the Worker-Priest movement be revived, albeit under strict controls; his request, however, was denied.
In 1963, Feltin denied Édith Piaf a religious funeral due to her controversial life. However, on 10 October 2013, fifty years after her death, the Roman Catholic Church gave Piaf a memorial Mass in the St. Jean-Baptiste Church in Belleville, Paris, the parish into which she was born.

References

External links
Catholic-Hierarchy
Cardinals of the Holy Roman Church
 

1883 births
1975 deaths
Cardinals created by Pope Pius XII
20th-century French cardinals
Archbishops of Paris
Archbishops of Sens
Bishops of Troyes
Participants in the Second Vatican Council
French military personnel of World War I
Burials at Notre-Dame de Paris